Kurigram Express (Train no. 797-798) is a non-stop intercity train that runs between Dhaka (capital of Bangladesh) and the northern Kurigram District. This train provides a more effective connection between the capital and northern Bengal.

History 
On October 16, 2019, prime minister Sheikh Hasina inaugurated this train service by video conference. This named train service is running with the cars imported from Indonesia. The coaches are originately PT INKA rolling stock.

Locomotives and seats 
The train has 14 coaches in addition to a locomotive.

Schedule 
Kurigram Express begins its journey from Kurigram at 7:20 am and it reaches Dhaka at 5:25 pm.
On the return trip, it leaves Dhaka at 8:45 pm and reaches Kurigram at 6:15 am.

Stops 
The train makes stops at the following 9 stations:
 Kurigram railway station
 Rangpur railway station
 Badargang railway station
 Parbatipur railway station
 Joypurhat railway station
 Santahar railway station
 Madhnagar railway station
 Natore railway Station
 Airport railway station, Dhaka
 Kamalapur railway station

See also 
 Panchagarh Express

References

External links

Named passenger trains of Bangladesh